Daniele Sottile (born 17 August 1979) is an Italian volleyball player, a member of the Italy men's national volleyball team and Italian club Top Volley Latina, silver medalist of the 2015 World Cup and bronze medalist of the 2015 European Championship.

Sporting achievements

Clubs

CEV Cup
  1996/1997 - with Piemonte Volley
  1997/1998 - with Piemonte Volley
  1998/1999 - with Piemonte Volley
  1999/2000 - with Piemonte Volley
  2012/2013 - with Andreoli Latina

CEV Challenge Cup
  2014/2015 - with Top Volley Latina

FIVB Club World Championship
  Brazil 2021 – with Cucine Lube Civitanova

National championships
 1996/1997  Italian SuperCup, with Piemonte Volley
 1998/1999  Italian Cup, with Piemonte Volley
 1999/2000  Italian SuperCup, with Piemonte Volley
 2002/2003  Italian SuperCup, with Piemonte Volley

National team
 1997  FIVB U19 World Championship
 2015  CEV European Championship
 2015  FIVB World Cup
 2016  Olympic Games

External links

LegaVolley player profile

1979 births
Living people
People from Milazzo
Sportspeople from the Province of Messina
Italian men's volleyball players
Blu Volley Verona players
Umbria Volley players
Olympic volleyball players of Italy
Volleyball players at the 2016 Summer Olympics
Medalists at the 2016 Summer Olympics
Olympic silver medalists for Italy
Olympic medalists in volleyball
Setters (volleyball)